Raul Victor da Silva Cajazeiras, or simply Raul (born 26 July 1981), is a Brazilian footballer who plays as an attacking midfielder for Santa Cruz FC.

Honours 
Alagoas State League:	2011
Ceará Liga:	1998, 1999, 2008
Goiás State League:	2009
Rio Grande do Sul State League:	2004

External links 
 ogol.com.br
 sambafoot
 ig.com.br

1981 births
Living people
Brazilian footballers
Brazilian expatriate footballers
Horizonte Futebol Clube players
Association football forwards
Sportspeople from Fortaleza